Geir Almåsvold Mo (born 2 November 1966 in Lærdal) is a Norwegian politician for the Progress Party.

He served as a deputy representative to the Parliament of Norway from Telemark during the term 1993–1997, but did not meet in parliamentary session. On the local level Mo was a deputy member of Notodden city council from 1991 to 1995. During the same period he was also a member of Telemark county council. In 2003 he was elected to the borough council in Østensjø, Oslo.

Mo became secretary-general of the Progress Party in 1994, stepping down in 2009 to become chief of staff for Siv Jensen. He had to reassume the position in late 2010, serving throughout 2011. Following a bout with legionella, in the spring of 2012 he also resigned as chief of staff for Siv Jensen and became managing director of Norges Lastebileier-Forbund.

Mo has also been a member of the Broadcasting Council.

References

1966 births
Living people
Deputy members of the Storting
Progress Party (Norway) politicians
Politicians from Telemark
People from Notodden
People from Lærdal